Matthew Allen Ganuelas-Rosser (born June 13, 1990) is a Filipino professional basketball player for the TNT Tropang Giga of the Philippine Basketball Association (PBA). He played college basketball for the NCAA Division II school Cal Poly Pomona. He was recruited to play for the Philippine national basketball team during their 2012 William Jones Cup campaign.  He was drafted 4th overall by NLEX in the 2014 PBA draft.

Early life and high school career
Ganuelas-Rosser was born in Olongapo City, where his father James Rosser and mother Gina Ganuelas met. James is a retired U.S. Navy who was stationed in Subic Bay for many years. But the Mount Pinatubo eruption in 1991 forced the Rossers to move to San Diego when Matt was just two years old. When he was six, he started to love the sport of basketball. When he went to middle school, his potential slowly began to show. He played four years of high school basketball in Temecula Valley High School where he was the tallest player on the team. Scouts from various Division I colleges started to notice him. But a knee injury sidelined him in his senior year where he missed 15 games. Despite the injury, he averaged 18 points and 10 rebounds per game.

College career
Rosser played for California State Polytechnic University, Pomona Broncos from 2008 to 2012. During his four years at Cal Poly Pomona, he finished seventh all-time in games played and helped the Broncos capture the 2010 NCAA Men's Division II Basketball Championship.

College statistics

|-
| style="text-align:left;"| 2011–12
| style="text-align:left;"| California State Polytechnic University
| 27 || 30.4 || .508 || .412 || .726 || 2.7 || 2.85 || 1.11 || .63 || 7.80
|-
| style="text-align:left;"| 2010–11
| style="text-align:left;"| California State Polytechnic University
| 28 || 29.5 || .351 || .194 || .765 || 2.4 || 2.50 || .75 || .35 || 5.70
|-
| style="text-align:left;"| 2009–10
| style="text-align:left;"| California State Polytechnic University
| 34|| 20.6 || .458 || .259 || .627 || 1.8 || 1.05 || .41 || .23 || 4.80
|-
| style="text-align:left;"| 2008–09
| style="text-align:left;"| California State Polytechnic University
| 25 || 9.80 || .410 || 0.0 || .680 || 0.9 || .36 || .24 || .32 || 2.0
|-

Professional career
On August 24, 2014, Ganuelas-Rosser was picked by the NLEX Road Warriors in the 2014 PBA draft as their 4th overall pick. On September 22, 2014, Rosser was sent from NLEX to Talk 'N Text which is a part of a series of trades between Talk 'N Text, GlobalPort, and the NLEX Road Warriors. That season, he was in the Rookies vs. Sophomores exhibition game and won MVP, scoring 24 of his 32 points in a 150-131 win. He also scored his PBA elimination round high of 22 points in a win against the San Miguel Beermen.

On April 24, 2017, Ganuelas-Rosser was traded by the TNT KaTropa to the San Miguel Beermen in exchange for RR Garcia.

On January 24, 2018, Ganuelas-Rosser grabbed a career-high 12 rebounds to go along with 10 points and 4 steals in a 107–93 win over the NorthPort Batang Pier.

On February 2, 2021, Ganuelas-Rosser, along with Russel Escoto, Gelo Alolino, and two future first-round picks, was traded to the Terrafirma Dyip for CJ Perez. On January 1, 2023, he became an unrestricted free agent and subsequently declined a new contract with the team.

On January 21, 2022, Ganuelas-Rosser signed with TNT Tropang Giga to return to the franchise that drafted him.

PBA career statistics

As of the end of 2021 season

Season-by-season averages

|-
| align=left | 
| align=left | Talk 'N Text
| 50 || 24.0 || .507 || .300 || .634 || 4.1 || 1.5 || .5 || 1.1 || 8.5
|-
| align=left | 
| align=left | TNT
| 38 || 18.6 || .405 || .143 || .434 || 2.2 || 1.7 || .4 || .5 || 4.2
|-
| align=left rowspan=2| 
| align=left | TNT
| rowspan=2|35 || rowspan=2|15.7 || rowspan=2|.533 || rowspan=2|.000 || rowspan=2|.541 || rowspan=2|2.9 || rowspan=2|1.7 || rowspan=2|.5 || rowspan=2|.5 || rowspan=2|4.3
|-
| align=left | San Miguel
|-
| align=left | 
| align=left | San Miguel
| 47 ||	14.7 || .605 || .000 || .368 || 2.7 || 1.1 || .6 || .4 || 3.4
|-
| align=left | 
| align=left | San Miguel
| 45 ||	10.7 || .483 || – || .294 || 1.4 || 1.1 || .4 || .3 || 1.4
|-
| align=left rowspan=2| 
| align=left | Terrafirma
| rowspan=2|21 || rowspan=2|19.7 || rowspan=2|.556 || rowspan=2|.000 || rowspan=2|.474 || rowspan=2|2.8 || rowspan=2|2.2 || rowspan=2|1.1 || rowspan=2|.5 || rowspan=2|4.2
|-
| align=left | TNT
|-
|-class=sortbottom
| align=center colspan=2 | Career
| 236 || 17.1 || .506 || .185 || .537 || 2.7 || 1.5 || .6 || .6 || 4.4

International career
Ganuelas-Rosser is part of the Smart Gilas team that brought home the gold during the 2012 William Jones Cup. During the 2012 William Jones Cup, he played in 3 out of the 8 games, averaging 9.6 MPG, 2.67 PPG and 1.67 RPG. He was also part of the Sinag Pilipinas team that won the gold medal in the 2013 SEA Games in Myanmar.  After his rookie season in the PBA, he was named to the 16-man Gilas Pilipinas 3.0 pool and saw action in both the Estonia pocket tournament and in the 2015 William Jones Cup. After a successful stint in the Jones Cup, he was named to the 12-man Gilas Pilipinas roster that competed in the 2015 FIBA Asia Championship in Changsha and won the silver medal.

Personal life
Ganuelas-Rosser has two younger brothers, Brandon and Jason, and has a degree of Business Management. He enjoys watching movies, listening to music and eating in his free time. Brandon is currently playing for the NLEX Road Warriors. He was drafted #1 overall by Blackwater Bossing in the 2022 PBA draft.

References

1990 births
Living people
Basketball players from Zambales
Cal Poly Pomona Broncos men's basketball players
Competitors at the 2013 Southeast Asian Games
Filipino men's basketball players
Filipino people of African-American descent
NLEX Road Warriors draft picks
Philippines men's national basketball team players
San Miguel Beermen players
Shooting guards
Small forwards
Southeast Asian Games gold medalists for the Philippines
Southeast Asian Games medalists in basketball
Sportspeople from Olongapo
Terrafirma Dyip players
TNT Tropang Giga players